Pavle Jurišić Šturm KCMG (8 August 1848 – 13 January 1922), born Paulus Eugen Sturm, was a Serbian general of Sorbian origin, best known for commanding the Serbian 3rd Army in World War I.

Biography
Paulus Eugen Sturm was born on 22 August 1848. in Görlitz, Prussian Silesia, of ethnic Sorb origin. He moved with his brother to Serbia and joined the Serbian army. Šturm became one of the most important commanders in the Serbian army in World War I, especially during its first two years, the time when his 3rd army was main support either for the 2nd army during the battle of Cer (August 1914), or for the 1st army during the battle of Kolubara (November to December 1914).

He and his brother Eugene (Evgenije) graduated from the royal Prussian military academy in Breslau (Wrocław), and participated in the Franco-Prussian War of 1870–1871. They later resigned their commissions and moved to the Principality of Serbia, prior to the Serbian–Ottoman War (1876–78), in order to lecture at the Serbian Military Academy in Belgrade. With the outbreak of the war, the two brothers joined the Serbian Army as volunteers. Pavle also fought in the Serbo-Bulgarian War (1885) as commander of a regiment.

He liked Serbia, and married a Serbian woman. In order to become naturalised, he changed his name into Pavle Jurišić-Šturm in 1876, Pavle being a cognate of Paulus, and Jurišić being derived from a modulated translation of the word "charge" (sturm in German, juriš in Serbian). He kept his German last name as an alias ("Šturm").

In the Balkan Wars (1912–13) he was the General of the Drina Division, which distinguished itself at the Battle of Kumanovo after which he was promoted to the rank of general.

As commander of the Third Serbian Army, he participated in all major battles in the Serbian theater in World War I, from Cer and Kolubara, then retreated over frozen Albania, and the participation of the Serbian Army on the  Salonika front. Here, his army fought in the Battle of Kajmakcalan, suffering many casualties. After this battle Sturm was replaced at the head of the Third Army by Miloš Vasić in October 1916. He was sent to Russia to assist the commander of the Serbian Volunteer Corps. In early 1917, he returned via Japan to Thessaloniki, where he was appointed Chancellor of the Order of the Crown, a job he held until the end of the war.

After years of peace that followed, Šturm stayed in Serbia and remained in its army with the rank of general. He died in 1922 at his home in Belgrade.

Šturm was decorated with Order of Order of the Karađorđe's Star, Order of the White Eagle and Allied decorations of the Order of the Crown of Italy, Order of St. George,  BelgianOrder of the Crown, the Legion of Honour and the Order of St. Michael and St. George. Possibly the most valuable was the Order of Paulovnia Flowers on the Great Cross, personally decorated by Japanese Emperor. He was also the bearer of the Order of Iron Cross, 2nd class, and the Austrian Order of Leopold.

He was considered one of the greatest commanders of First World War and one of the best commanders in Serbian war history.

Decorations

See also
 Petar Bojović
 Radomir Putnik
 Živojin Mišić
 Stepa Stepanović
 Božidar Janković
 Ilija Gojković
 Ivan S. Pavlović

References

Sources
Books

News articles

1848 births
1922 deaths
People from Görlitz
People from the Province of Silesia
Sorbian people
Serbian generals
Serbian military personnel of World War I
Honorary Knights Commander of the Order of St Michael and St George
Foreign volunteers in Serbian armies
Immigrants to the Principality of Serbia
Royal Serbian Army soldiers
German military personnel of the Franco-Prussian War